Diego Andrés Corredor Hurtado (born 30 June 1981) is a Colombian football manager and former player who played as a midfielder.

Playing career
Corredor was born in Tunja, and was bought by Deportes Tolima in 1999 from CD Corber de Tunja. He subsequently made his first team debut for the former club, but was not able to establish himself in the first team, and was loaned to Atlético Huila in 2003.

In 2004, Corredor moved to hometown side Patriotas Boyacá, and helped in their promotion to the Categoría Primera A in 2011. He retired in that year, after struggling severely with injuries.

Managerial career
Immediately after retiring, Corredor became a manager of Patriotas' youth setup. In 2013, he became an assistant of Julio Comesaña in the main squad while also working for the youths, and in 2014 he became the assistant of Harold Rivera.

In April 2016, after Rivera took a personal license, Corredor was named interim manager of Patriotas. On 14 December of that year, he was named permanent manager after Rivera left.

On 3 October 2019, Corredor resigned from Patriotas in order to take a trip to Europe for studies. On 5 December, he was appointed Deportivo Pasto manager for the 2020 campaign.

Sacked by Pasto on 9 April 2021, Corredor took over Once Caldas also in the top tier on 26 August. On 13 February 2023, he left Once Caldas on a mutual agreement.

Personal life
Corredor's father Luis Arturo was also a manager, while his younger brother Iván was also a footballer and midfielder. Both Diego and Iván played together at Patriotas.

References

External links

1981 births
Living people
People from Tunja
Colombian footballers
Association football midfielders
Deportes Tolima footballers
Atlético Huila footballers
Patriotas Boyacá footballers
Colombian football managers
Categoría Primera A managers
Patriotas Boyacá managers
Deportivo Pasto managers
Once Caldas managers
Sportspeople from Boyacá Department